From Bed to Worse may refer to:

 "From Bed to Worse" (The Cleveland Show), a 2009 episode of The Cleveland Show
 From Bed to Worse (The Ant and the Aardvark), a 1971 cartoon of The Ant and the Aardvark